XEJ-AM is a radio station on 970 AM in Ciudad Juárez, Chihuahua, Mexico.

History
After coming to air on May 17, 1930, XEJ received its first concession on December 1, 1932, the first day concessions were awarded for Mexican radio stations. Owned by Buttner Valenzuela y Compañía, XEJ was among the first Mexican radio stations outside of Mexico City and broadcast on the split frequency of 1015 kilohertz. In 1937, XEJ was sold to Pedro Meneses y Hoyos, and by 1941, XEJ was on its now-familiar frequency of 970 kHz. Meneses built XEJ into a larger organization; his family established XEJ television in 1954 and other stations across Chihuahua. Mexican Broadcasting Co., S.A. became the concessionaire on May 2, 1957, and Radiofónica del Norte replaced MBC in 1977.

References

Radio stations in Chihuahua
Grupo Radio Centro
Radio stations established in 1930
News and talk radio stations in Mexico